The 2014–15 Women's National League was the fourth season of the Women's National League. On 20 August 2014, at the Aviva Stadium, Continental Tyres were unveiled as the new sponsor of both the Women's National League and FAI Women's Cup. Before the season started there were two name changes following takeovers and/or mergers. Shamrock Rovers withdrew from the league, leaving seven teams to play each other.

Wexford Youths won the league title, finishing two points clear of second placed UCD Waves. UCD Waves also finished as runners-up in the 2014 FAI Women's Cup, losing 2–1 after extra time in the final to Raheny United. Raheny then went on to complete a cup double when they also won the 2015 WNL Cup. It is first time Raheny United had won the latter cup. In the final they defeated Peamount United 3–2 after extra time with a last minute Katie McCabe goal. McCabe, who had also scored in the FAI Women's Cup final, missed out on the opportunity to finish the season as the league top goalscorer after Raheny's final league opponents, Cork City, forfeited the game as they were unable to field a team. Aine O'Gorman finished the season as both top league goalscorer and the WNL Player of the Season.

Final table

WNL Awards
Senior Player of the Year
 Áine O'Gorman (UCD Waves)
Young Player of the Year
 Rianna Jarrett (Wexford Youths)
Irish Daily Mail Golden Boot
 Áine O'Gorman (UCD Waves)
Service to Women's Football Award 
 Pauline O'Shaughnessy (WFAI)
Team of the Season

References

Women's National League (Ireland) seasons
Ireland
Women
Women
1